Maria Andersson or Anderson may refer to:

Sports
Maria Andersson (athlete) from 1982 IAAF World Cross Country Championships – Senior women's race
Maria Andersson (co-driver) in 2007 World Rally Championship season
Maria Andersson (footballer) from Dalsjöfors GoIF

Others
Maria Andersson (businesswoman)
Maria Andersson (musician), musician in Sahara Hotnights
Maria Anderson (ballet dancer) in Cinderella (Fitinhof-Schell) etc.
Maria Anderson, Daughter of the Regiment (1791–1881), also known as Maria Hill

See also
Mari Andersson (born 1986), Swedish tennis player